Franz Anton Ketterer (1676–1749) was a German clockmaker.

He is chiefly remembered as one of the earliest makers of cuckoo clocks in the Black Forest. His family carried on the business of clockmaking, and his German descendants continue to manufacture weather instruments.

There is an interesting myth surrounding Ketterer. Not much can be found on the Internet about him or his work. A very old thread speaks of the myth *1) and names a source:  Deutsches Uhrenmuseum (German clock museum) has stated:
"In 1810 Markus Fidelis Jaeck wrote in his book 'Darstellungen der Industrie und des Verkehrs auf dem Schwarzwald' that Franz (Anton) Ketterer of Furtwangen invented the cuckoo clock around 1730. But this story cannot be true. Franz Anton Ketterer was born in 1734 and died in 1806".

The village of Schönwald dedicated a street to the clockmaker Ketterer (Uhrmacher-Ketterer-Strasse) and names Franziskus Ketterer (1676 - 
2.7.1753 in Schönwald) as the inventor of the cuckoo clock.

When digging into the origin of wooden cuckoo clocks, there is much more to be found of what could almost be called "the founders of a reborn clock industry", Simon Dilger and his son Johann Friedrich Dilger.
In a German text *2) it is mentioned that Anton Ketterer was son of Franz Ketterer. Maybe the confusion of the dates of births stem from mixing these two people's lives?

According to another German text *3) Simon Dilger was the teacher of Anton Ketterer.

There is no single conclusion to the question of who invented the cuckoo clock, but it is probably true that Ketterer was a major player in their development.

External links
 Franz Ketterer Meteorologie official site
1 http://mb.nawcc.org/showthread.php?17847-About-Cuckoo-Clocks-history
2 http://de.wikisource.org/wiki/ADB:Dilger,_Simon
3 http://www.schollach.de/index.php/uhrmacherei

1676 births
1749 deaths
German clockmakers
People from Schwarzwald-Baar-Kreis